Jack Dávila is an American attorney and judge.  He has served as a Wisconsin Circuit Court Judge in Milwaukee County since 2020.

Life and career 

He received a B.A. from the University of Wisconsin in 2002. After college, he served in the U.S. Army as a Spanish linguist. He then attended  Marquette University Law School, where he received a J.D. in 2011.
Following law school Dávila was an attorney at Tabak Law Firm followed by the Previant Law Firm, where he represented plaintiffs in personal injury and workers compensation cases.
In 2020, Governor Tony Evers appointed Dávila to the circuit court after he appointed his predecessor, Maxine White, to the Wisconsin Court of Appeals. He was elected in 2021 after running unopposed.

References

External links
 Jack Dávila at Ballotpedia

People from Milwaukee County, Wisconsin
Wisconsin lawyers
Wisconsin state court judges
21st-century American judges
Living people
Year of birth missing (living people)